Natalia Guitler (born 4 June 1987) is a former professional Brazilian tennis player, freestyle footballer, footvolley player, and teqball player.

Biography 
Guitler was born on June 4, 1987, in Rio de Janeiro Brazil. Her family is originally from Argentina, from where her parents emigrated in 1980. She is the fourth daughter of Leonor Rosa Maman and Cesar Alberto Guitler. She has three older brothers, Gaston, Felipe and Lucas.

Tennis career 
When she was just four years old, she started playing tennis, a sport that led her to live in Argentina for 5 years. On July 6, 2009, she reached her highest WTA singles ranking of 454 whilst her best doubles ranking was 461 on November 2, 2009. She has won one singles and four doubles titles on the ITF Circuit. She left professional tennis at the end of 2009.

Teqball career 
Guitler started playing teqball after tennis. In 2018, her partner Marcos Vieira da Silva finished fourth in doubles. The following year they became champions in Budapest.

Natalia has gained national and international fame by showing her entire category in Footvolley and futmesa matches against well-known athletes like Neymar and Ronaldinho among others.

Her talent earned her the signing of an agreement with Adidas, representing the brand as an ambassador for women's football and with Mikasa, signing her official Futvolley ball.

ITF Circuit Finals

Singles : 3 (1–2)

Doubles : 8 (4–4)

References

External links
 
 

1987 births
Living people
Brazilian female tennis players
Teqball
Sportspeople from Rio de Janeiro (city)
20th-century Brazilian women
21st-century Brazilian women